The medley relay swimming events for the 2020 Summer Paralympics took place at the Tokyo Aquatics Centre from September 2 to September 3, 2021. A total of two events were contested.

Schedule

Medal summary
The following is a summary of the medals awarded across all 4 × 100 metre medley relay events. Medals are also awarded to swimmers who have swum in heats.

 Swimmers who participated in the heats only and received medals.

Results
The following were the results of the finals only of each of the medley relay events in each of the classifications. Further details of each event, including where appropriate heats and semi finals results, are available on that event's dedicated page.

Men's 4x100m

The final in this classification took place on 3 September 2021:

Women's 4x100m

The final in this classification took place on 2 September 2021:

Notes

References

External links
 

Swimming at the 2020 Summer Paralympics